Camptodontornis is an extinct genus of enantiornithine bird which existed in what is now Chaoyang in Liaoning Province, China during the early Cretaceous period (Aptian age). It is known from a well-preserved skeleton including a skull found in the Jiufotang Formation of Liaoning Province. Its original generic name was "Camptodontus" (meaning "bent tooth"); it was named by Li Li, En-pu Gong, Li-dong Zhang, Ya-jun Yang and Lian-hai Hou in 2010. However, the name had previously been used for a genus of beetle (Dejean, 1826). The type species is "Camptodontus" yangi. Demirjian (2019) coined a replacement generic name Camptodontornis. The status of C. yangi as a distinct species is disputed, with Wang et al. (2015) considering it to be a probable synonym of Longipteryx chaoyangensis.

References

Longipterygids
Prehistoric bird genera
Aptian life
Early Cretaceous birds of Asia
Cretaceous China
Fossils of China
Paleontology in Liaoning
Fossil taxa described in 2010
Fossil taxa described in 2019